The Embassy of Kosovo in Ottawa is the official diplomatic mission of the Kosovo to Canada.

References

2009 establishments in Canada
Diplomatic missions in Ottawa
Canada–Kosovo relations
Diplomatic missions of Kosovo